Pirkko "Piitu" Uski (born 30 December 1967 Rovaniemi, Finland) is a Finnish actress. She is famous for her role in the half-hour soap opera Salatut Elämät, in which she plays Laura Kiviranta, a busy female lawyer. She plays many different roles in theatre.

Piitu has written a  cookbook, Salatut (keittiö) elämät (Secret (kitchen) lives) with Susanna Laaksonen, a Finnish scriptwriter.

Piitu gave her voice to some Fazer radio advertising.

References

External links

Finnish actresses
People from Rovaniemi
1967 births
Living people